Šimon Nemec (born 15 February 2004) is a Slovak professional ice hockey defenceman for the Utica Comets in the American Hockey League (AHL) as a prospect to the New Jersey Devils of the National Hockey League (NHL). He was drafted second overall by the Devils in the 2022 NHL Entry Draft, becoming the second of back-to-back Slovak selections.

Competing internationally as part of Slovak national team, Nemec won a bronze medal at the 2022 Winter Olympics, which was the first Olympic medal for Slovakia in ice hockey. He is identified as part of a rising new generation of Slovak ice hockey players.

Playing career

HK Nitra
Nemec was born in Liptovský Mikuláš, Slovakia, and played youth hockey for the local club, MHk 32 Liptovský Mikuláš. Nemec began playing at the highest level in Slovakian hockey, Tipos Extraliga, starting in the 2019–20 season at the age of 15 with HK Nitra. In his 2019–20 season, he split his time between Tipos Extraliga, Slovak 2. Liga and Slovakia U20 team. After the conclusion of the season, in league play, he solely played in Tipos Extraliga.

Nemec's Canadian Hockey League (CHL) rights are owned by the Cape Breton Eagles of the Quebec Major Junior Hockey League (QMJHL). He was selected fourth overall by Cape Breton in the 2021 CHL Import Draft; however, Nemec preferred to play his draft year season in Slovakia.

Going into his draft year, Nemec improved his game and recorded one goal and 25 assists for 26 points in 39 games for HK Nitra in the 2021–22 Slovak Extraliga season. In the playoffs, he recorded five goals and 12 assists for 17 points in 19 games, taking his team to the finals, where HK Nitra lost in six games to HC Slovan Bratislava.

New Jersey Devils

2022 NHL Entry Draft
Following the 2021–22 Slovak Extraliga season, Nemec was seen as one of the top defensive prospects heading into the 2022 NHL Entry Draft and debated alongside Czech David Jiříček as the defenceman to be taken first. Throughout the year, multiple scouts considered him a top five selection. On 7 July 2022, he was selected second overall by the New Jersey Devils, after fellow countryman Juraj Slafkovský was selected first overall by the Montreal Canadiens, thus becoming the two highest drafted Slovak-born players in the NHL Entry Draft history. It was only the second time in history that a single European nation had the top two selections in the draft, after Russia in 2004. On 14 July, Nemec signed a three-year, entry-level contract with the Devils.

International play

Nemec participated as part of Team Slovakia in the 2021 World Junior Ice Hockey Championships, leading Slovakia in scoring with four points and being named one of his team's top three players. He then made his senior IIHF international debut as part of the national senior team at the 2021 IIHF World Championship. Later in 2021 he served as Slovakia U18 team's captain at the 2021 Hlinka Gretzky Cup, leading the team to a silver medal. He was voted most valuable player of the tournament, scoring one goal and five assists for six points in five games.

After participating in the aborted 2022 World Junior Ice Hockey Championships, cancelled as a result of the COVID-19 pandemic, Nemec was named to the Slovak squad for the 2022 Winter Olympics. He was one of three teenagers on the team, alongside fellow defenceman Samuel Kňažko and forward Juraj Slafkovský. He finished the tournament with an assist in seven games as Slovakia won the bronze medal game against Sweden, their first-ever Olympic medal in ice hockey. In his second outing of the year with the senior team at the 2022 IIHF World Championship, Nemec lead all Slovak defencemen in scoring with one goal and five assists in eight games.

Career statistics

Regular season and playoffs

International

References

External links
 

2004 births
Living people
HK Levice players
HK Nitra players
Ice hockey players at the 2022 Winter Olympics
Medalists at the 2022 Winter Olympics
National Hockey League first-round draft picks
New Jersey Devils draft picks
Olympic bronze medalists for Slovakia
Olympic ice hockey players of Slovakia
Olympic medalists in ice hockey
Slovak ice hockey defencemen
Sportspeople from Liptovský Mikuláš
Utica Comets players
Slovak expatriate ice hockey players in the United States